The 2002 Arkansas gubernatorial election took place on November 5, 2002 for the post of Governor of Arkansas. Incumbent Republican governor Mike Huckabee defeated Democratic State Treasurer Jimmie Lou Fisher.

Democratic primary

Candidates
Jimmie Lou Fisher, Arkansas State Treasurer
Joe Holmes, former prosecutor
Jim Billie

Results

Republican primary

Candidates
Mike Huckabee, incumbent Governor of Arkansas
Doyle Cannady, retired banker

Results

General election

Campaign
At the start of the election campaign Huckabee was expected to win the election easily with a poll in July showing him 16% ahead. Fisher began the campaign by unveiling plans on issues such as prescription drugs, education and domestic violence. She also attacked Huckabee for mismanagement and likened him to a dictator for his response to criticism over cost overruns in a new computer system.

Huckabee's record as Governor became an issue in the election with Fisher's campaign attacking Huckabee for granting clemency to violent criminals, including a rapist. However Huckabee responded that he had signed more death warrants and executed more people than any other governor of Arkansas. Huckabee called on voters to support him due to the progress in education, health care and the economy during his period as governor. Huckabee also criticised Fisher for receiving help from former governor Bill Clinton, describing him as having had his turn.

Huckabee's lead in the polls declined as the election neared, with a poll in September showing him with a 12% lead and one in mid-October showing him 10% ahead. Near the end of October a poll showed Huckabee only 2% ahead of Fisher. Huckabee's campaign was hurt by his wife's struggling campaign to become Arkansas secretary of state; voters were concerned over the couple holding too much power, with polls showing Janet Huckabee over 20% behind. In late October a fundraising letter from Huckabee's campaign described it as in crisis. Huckabee was also sued by his daughter Sarah in his role as governor in a lawsuit he wanted to lose. This came after a state court ordered that students should be removed from the voting rolls in Arkadelphia. Huckabee suggested his daughter join a federal lawsuit which succeeded in getting the students restored.

Predictions

Results

References

External links
Campaign websites (Archived)
Jimmie Lou Fisher
Mike Huckabee

2002
Arkansas
Gubernatorial
Mike Huckabee